Song So-hee (born October 20, 1997), is a South Korean singer who specializes in traditional Korean music known as gugak. She rose to fame after winning the KBS National Singing Contest in 2008 at the age of 11, earning her a reputation as a gugak prodigy. The South Korean government honored Song with the title, "Best Korean of the Year," in 2010.

Early life and education
Song was born in Yesan, Chungcheongnam-do, South Korea on October 20, 1997. She is the eldest daughter of Song Geun-yeong (her father), and Yang Bok-rye (her mother). She has one younger sister, Song So-yeong.

Song displayed her talent for music at a very young age, which she later attributed to her father's habit of singing minyo, a genre of Korean folk songs, to her. When she was five years old, her parents enrolled her in a gugak academy to develop her singing skills. She studied under gugak singers Park Seok-sun and Lee Ho-yeon, the latter of whom is classified as a "Living National Treasure" by the South Korean government. She learned to play traditional Korean percussion instruments under samul nori master Lee Gwang-su.

Song attended Deoksan Elementary School, Imseong Middle School, and Hoseo High School, all in Chungcheongnam-do. In 2016, she enrolled in Dankook University's School of Music to study gugak.

Career 
Song became famous nationwide after she performed "Changbu Taryeong" at the 2008 KBS National Singing Contest. Her performance left a deep impression upon the viewers. She won the grand prize in the contest and became the youngest grand prize winner in the 29 years of the contest's history.

She sang songs such as "Changbu Taryeong", "Taepyongga", "Arirang", "Batnori", "Gunbam Taryeong", and "Battuiwara" on these programs and became more famous.

Her appearance on Star King in 2008 led her to another important training opportunity from Master Lee Ho-yoen, who is a specialist in Gyeonggi minyo. Having been impressed by So-hee's talent, Master Lee volunteered to provide training for her on a regular basis. Minyo (Korean folk music) literally means "song of folklore" and is the traditional music sung most frequently by Koreans. Minyo is broadly classified into three types according to region: Gyeonggi, Namdo, and Seodo Minyo. Gyeonggi Minyo is traditionally popular in the central area around Seoul.

"She was born with a gift for singing Minyo. She has high-pitched voice tone and it's a clear, ringing voice (which is essential for singing minyo). She also has an extraordinary sense of pitch which enables her to learn new songs with ease. Also, her Bangulmok, a singing technique of Korean traditional music is exquisite" 

Since 2008, she has been invited to perform at various events, both at home and abroad. Her main domestic events are Celebration of the 60th anniversary of the Republic of Korea in 2008, Baekje International Cultural Festival in 2010, Jeonju International Sori Festival in 2010, and Public Broadcasters International Seoul Meeting in 2011.

Song's popularity rapidly spread around the world due to her online videos and also the online replay services of South Korean TV programs she performed at, allowing people around the world to watch her performances. Many of them were stunned by her performances and fell in love with her and minyo.

Such international recognition provided her with opportunities to perform abroad. Since 2009, she has been invited to perform at official events and a variety of culture exchange events in various countries including Japan, Russia, and the United States. Some of those are the Korea-Japan Culture Exchange in 2009, the celebration of the twentieth anniversary of the establishment of diplomatic relations between Korean and Russia in 2010, the Korean Festival in 2011, and the Opening events of Korean Cultural Center India in 2012. In 2010, the government chose her as "Best Korean of the Year", an yearly award for someone who has graced and enriched the nation. In 2014, Song sang "Arirang" at the closing ceremony of the Sochi Winter Paralympics on March 10, and also won first place on the July 26th installment of "Immortal Song 2". As an artist signed under Warner Music Korea, Song So-hee has released two mini-albums and one single: 2015's New Song, 2016's "Love, Seasons" single, and 2018's Modern Folk Songs (a collaboration with the band Second Moon).

Discography

Extended plays

Singles

Compilation Appearances

Filmography

Variety shows

Television shows

Ambassadorship 
Korean hanbok ambassador (2022)

References

External links

 Official website (in Korean)
 Official Instagram (in Korean)
 Personal Instagram (in Korean)

1997 births
Living people
21st-century South Korean singers
South Korean Buddhists
21st-century South Korean women singers
Eunjin Song clan
Korean traditional musicians